The Working Cabinet was sworn in on 27 October 2014, by President of Indonesia Joko Widodo.

History

Background
On 15 September, president-elect Joko Widodo stated that his cabinet would have 34 members, with 18 coming from professional backgrounds and 16 from political parties in his coalition. The cabinet was due to be announced on Wednesday 22 October, and a stage had been prepared at Jakarta's Tanjung Priok harbour, but this event was cancelled at the last minute. The delays were caused by the decision of Joko Widodo to wait for comments from the People's Representative Council. Another reason for the delayed announcement was his decision involve the Indonesian Corruption Eradication Commission (KPK) and the Financial Transaction Reports and Analysis Centre (PPATK) to ensure that prospective ministers did not have poor track records with regards to human rights or corruption. The KPK stated the eight of the original candidates were "problematic" and that alternatives should be found. One candidate for the post of co-ordinating minister for security affairs, Wiranto was seen as having a problematic human rights record, and was not included in the final line up.

First Appointment

The cabinet line-up was announced on Sunday, 26 October 2014 and was sworn in on Monday, 27 October 2014. The cabinet consists of 34 ministers, 14 of whom are affiliated to their respective political parties. There are 26 men and eight women (including the country's first female foreign minister), with 20 ministers being under 45 years old at the time of their appointment. A member of the president's transitional team explained that unlike previous cabinets, Jokowi would not be appointing a cabinet secretary or a presidential spokesman. In another break with tradition, Jokowi did not name the attorney general or head of the Indonesian State Intelligence Agency.

Reshuffles
Jokowi reshuffled his cabinet on 12 August 2015 at the Presidential Palace, replacing five ministers and the cabinet secretary.

A second and more substantial cabinet reshuffle took place on 27 July 2016 with 13 ministers and the cabinet secretary being replaced.

A third reshuffle occurred on 17 January 2018, replacing Khofifah Indar Parawansa (who resigned) with Idrus Marham and Teten Masduki with Moeldoko.

Members

Head of Cabinet

Coordinating Ministers

Ministers

Deputy Ministers

Other Positions

See also

 Politics of Indonesia

References

Cabinets of Indonesia
Cabinets established in 2014
Cabinets disestablished in 2019
2014 establishments in Indonesia
2019 disestablishments in Indonesia
Cabinet